The men's BMX racing competition at the 2008 Summer Olympics took place on August 20–22 at the Laoshan BMX Field, the first to be officially featured in the Olympic cycling program.

Latvia's Māris Štrombergs powered his lead over the eight-strong final squad from the start to grab his nation's first gold medal at the Games. He stormed home on a sprint run to a finish in 36.190, leaving the American duo Mike Day and Donny Robinson behind at 36.606 and 36.972 for the silver and bronze medals respectively.

Qualification

Thirty-two riders representing twenty countries are qualified for the event. Qualification was based on UCI ranking by nations, 2008 UCI BMX World Championships results and wild-cards reserved to a Tripartite Commission (IOC, ANOC, UCI).

Competition format
Each of the 32 men competing performed two runs of the course in individual time trials to determine seeding for the knockout rounds. Then, they were grouped into 4 quarterfinal groups based on that seeding. Each quarterfinal consisted of three runs of the course, using a point-for-place system. The top four cyclists in each quarterfinal (for a total of 16) moved on to the semifinals. The semifinals also used a three-race point-for-place system to determine which cyclists advanced, with the top four in each of the two semifinals moving on to the final. Unlike the previous two rounds, the final consisted of a single race with the first to the finish line claiming the gold medal.

Schedule
All times are China Standard Time (UTC+8)

Results

Seeding

Quarterfinals

Heat 1

Heat 2

Heat 3

Heat 4

Semifinals

Semifinal 1

Semifinal 2

Final

References 

Cycling at the 2008 Summer Olympics
BMX at the Summer Olympics
2008 in BMX
Men's events at the 2008 Summer Olympics